In molecular biology, the Ycf4 protein is involved in the assembly of the photosystem I complex which is part of an energy-harvesting process named photosynthesis. Without Ycf4, photosynthesis would be inefficient affecting plant growth. Ycf4 is located in the thylakoid membrane of the chloroplast. Ycf4 is important for the light dependent reaction of photosynthesis.
To date, three thylakoid proteins involved in the stable accumulation of PSI have been identified, these are as follows:
 BtpA (INTERPRO),
 Ycf3
 Ycf4.
The Ycf4 protein is firmly associated with the thylakoid membrane, presumably through a transmembrane domain. Ycf4 co-fractionates with a protein complex larger than PSI upon sucrose density gradient centrifugation of solubilised thylakoids.

Ycf is an acronym standing for hypothetical chloroplast open reading frame.

References

Protein families
Protein domains
Photosynthesis